Nitropropane may refer to:

 1-Nitropropane
 2-Nitropropane